The 2015–16 season is MFK Zemplín Michalovce's first season in the Fortuna Liga after gaining promotion in the previous season in their 103rd year in existence.

Transfers (Summer)

Transfers in

Transfers out

For recent transfers, see List of Slovak football transfers summer 2015.

Transfers (Winter)

In:

Out:

 

For recent transfers, see List of Slovak football transfers winter 2015–16.

Current squad 
As of February 23, 2016.

Competitions

Pre-season friendlies

Fortuna Liga

League table

Matches

Slovnaft Cup

References

MFK Zemplín Michalovce seasons
Zemplin Michalovce season